Hugh I, Count of Blois, also known as Hugh I of Châtillon ( – 9 April 1248) was jure uxoris Count of Blois from 1230 to 1241, and Count of Saint Pol (as Hugh V) from 1226 to 1248.

Hugh was son of Gaucher III of Châtillon and Elisabeth, daughter of Hugo IV, Count of Saint-Pol. He married Agnes of Bar-le-Duc, daughter of Thibaut I of Bar-le-Duc and Hermesend of Bar-sur-Seine, in 1216. By 1225, Agnes was dead and Hugh married Marie.

In 1226, Hugh married Marie of Avesnes, daughter of Walter II of Avesnes and Margaret of Blois. They had 5 children:
 John I (d. 1280), Count of Blois
 Guy III (d. 1289), Count of Saint Pol
 Gaucher IV (d. 1261), lord of Chatillon, Crécy and Crèvecœur. His son was: Gaucher V de Châtillon.
 Hugh (d. 1255)
 Basile (d. 1280), became Abbess of Notre Dame du Val in 1248

Through his marriage Hugh became the first Count of Blois from the House of Châtillon. It marked the end of the first dynasty of Blois that lasted over 400 years. After the death of Marie, Hugh married Mahaut, sister of Baldwin III, Count of Guînes.

In 1226 the Cistercian nunnery Pont-aux-Dames in Couilly was founded by Hugh. Later Hugh, with the assistance of Philip Mécringes, founded a Cistercian nunnery at Troissy called L'Amour-Dieu in 1232.

Hugh intended to follow the pious king Louis IX when he started on the Seventh Crusade, but he died in 1248.

References

External links
 Counts of Blois

1248 deaths
Hugh I
Hugh I
Blois, Hugh I of Chatillon, comte de
Hugh I
Year of birth unknown
Christians of the Sixth Crusade